Blastobasis yuccaecolella is a moth in the family Blastobasidae. It is found in the United States, including Pennsylvania.

The larvae feed within decaying seed pods of Yucca baccata.

References

Moths described in 1910
Blastobasis
Moths of North America